Bradina flavalis is a moth in the family Crambidae. It was described by George Hampson in 1917. It is found in Cameroon.

References

Moths described in 1917
Bradina